Julio Rodolfo Moctezuma Cid (March 24, 1927 – August 4, 2000) was a Mexican lawyer who served as the first Secretary of Finance (1976–77) in the cabinet of President José López Portillo, as director-general of Pemex (1981–82) and as director-general of the now extinct Somex bank (1982–88).

Moctezuma was born in Mexico City into a family composed by Alberto Moctezuma —a farmer— and Alicia Cid. He graduated from the National Autonomous University of Mexico (UNAM) with a bachelor's degree Law and married Blanca Rosa Franco.

When José López Portillo —a close friend of his since the 1950s— assumed the presidency of Mexico, he served briefly as his first Secretary of Finance but was forced to resign on 17 November 1977 after several public policy disagreements with Carlos Tello Macías, the statist Secretary of Budget and Planning in the federal cabinet.

Moctezuma Cid died in Mexico City on August 4, 2000, aged 73.

References

Mexican Secretaries of Finance
National Autonomous University of Mexico alumni
Academic staff of the National Autonomous University of Mexico
20th-century Mexican lawyers
1927 births
2000 deaths